Chocolate is a food product made from roasted and ground cocoa pods mixed with fat (e.g. cocoa butter) and powdered sugar to produce a solid confectionery. There are several types of chocolate, classified primarily according to the proportion of cocoa and fat content used in a particular formulation.

The use of particular name designations is subject to governmental regulation in some countries.

List of types

Raw chocolate

Raw chocolate is chocolate that has not been processed, heated, or mixed with other ingredients. It is sold in chocolate-growing countries and to a lesser extent in other countries. It is often promoted as being healthy. Raw chocolate includes many essential antioxidants, minerals, and vitamins. This includes protein, iron, and fiber.

Dark chocolate

Dark chocolate, also known as "plain chocolate", is produced using a higher percentage of cocoa with all fat content coming from cocoa butter instead of milk, but there are also "dark milk" chocolates and many degrees of hybrids. Dark chocolate can be eaten as is, or used in cooking, for which thicker baking bars, usually with high cocoa percentages ranging from 70% to 100%, are sold. Many brands display the cocoa percentage on their packaging.

Milk chocolate

Milk chocolate is solid chocolate made with milk added in the form of powdered milk, liquid milk, or condensed milk. The first known variation was developed by Jordan & Timaeus in 1839 with donkey milk. In 1875 a Swiss confectioner, Daniel Peter, developed a solid milk-chocolate using condensed milk, which had been invented by Henri Nestlé, Peter's neighbour in Vevey.

Cadbury is the leading brand of milk chocolate in the United Kingdom. The Hershey Company is the largest producer in the US. The actual Hershey process is a trade secret, but experts speculate that the milk is partially lipolyzed, producing butyric acid, and then the milk is pasteurized, stabilizing it for use. This process gives the product a particular taste, to which the US public has developed an affinity, to the extent that some rival manufacturers now add butyric acid to their milk chocolates.

White chocolate

White chocolate is made of sugar, milk, and cocoa butter, without the cocoa solids. It is pale ivory coloured, and lacks many of the compounds found in milk and dark chocolates.

Baking chocolate 

Baking chocolate, or cooking chocolate, is chocolate intended to be used for baking and in sweet foods. Dark chocolate, milk chocolate, and white chocolate, are produced and marketed as baking chocolate. However, lower quality baking chocolate may not be as flavorful compared to higher-quality chocolate, and may have a different mouthfeel.

In the USA, baking chocolate containing no added sugar may be labeled "unsweetened chocolate".

Modeling chocolate

Modeling chocolate is a chocolate paste made by melting chocolate and combining it with corn syrup, glucose syrup, or golden syrup. It is primarily used by cakemakers and pâtisseries to add decoration to cakes and pastries.

Organic chocolate

Organic chocolate is chocolate which has been certified organic, generally meaning that there are no chemical fertilizers or pesticides used in growing the cocoa beans producing the chocolate. As of 2016, it was a growing sector in the global chocolate industry. Organic chocolate is a socially desirable product for some consumers. Many producers of organic chocolate source their ingredients from certified fair trade cocoa farms and cooperatives.

Compound chocolate

Compound chocolate is the name for a confection combining cocoa with other vegetable fats, usually tropical fats or hydrogenated fats, as a replacement for cocoa butter. It is often used for candy bar coatings. In many countries it can not legally be called "chocolate".

Couverture chocolate

Couverture chocolate is a class of high-quality chocolate containing a higher percentage of cocoa butter than other chocolate which is precisely tempered. Couverture chocolate is used by professionals for dipping, coating, molding and garnishing ('couverture' means 'covering' in French). Popular brands of couverture chocolate used by pastry chefs include: Valrhona, Lindt & Sprüngli, Scharffen Berger, Callebaut, and Guittard.

Ruby chocolate

Ruby chocolate is a type of chocolate created by Barry Callebaut, a Belgian–Swiss cocoa company. The variety was in development from 2004, and was released to the public in 2017. The chocolate type is made from the Ruby cocoa bean, resulting in a distinct red colour and a different flavor, described as "sweet yet sour".

Legal requirements by country/region

Canada
The legislation for cocoa and chocolate products in Canada is found in Division 4 of the Food and Drug Regulations (FDR), under the Food and Drugs Act (FDA). The Canadian Food Inspection Agency (CFIA) is responsible for the administration and enforcement of the FDR and FDA (as it relates to food).

The use of cocoa butter substitutes in Canada is not permitted. Chocolate sold in Canada cannot contain vegetable fats or oils.

The only sweetening agents permitted in chocolate in Canada are listed in Division 18 of the Food and Drug Regulations. Artificial sweeteners such as aspartame, sucralose, acesulfame potassium, and sugar alcohols (sorbitol, maltitol, etc.) are not permitted.

Products manufactured or imported into Canada that contain non-permitted ingredients (vegetable fats or oils, artificial sweeteners) cannot legally be called "chocolate" when sold in Canada. A non-standardized name such as "candy" must be used.

European Union and United Kingdom

There has been disagreement in the EU about the definition of chocolate; this dispute covers several issues, including the types of fat and the quantity of cocoa used. In 1999, however, the EU resolved the fat issue by allowing up to 5% of chocolate's content to be one of six alternatives to cocoa butter: illipe oil, palm oil, sal, shea butter, kokum gurgi, or mango kernel oil.

Products labelled as "family milk chocolate" elsewhere in the European Union are permitted to be labelled as simply "milk chocolate" in Malta, the UK and the Republic of Ireland.

Japan
In Japan, 'chocolate products' are classified on a complex scale.

:
 
Cocoa content ≥35%, cocoa butter ≥18%, sucrose ≤55%, lecithin ≤0.5%, no additives other than lecithin and vanilla flavoring, no fats other than cocoa butter and milk fats, water ≤3%
 
Cocoa content ≥21%, cocoa butter ≥18%, milk solids ≥14%, milk fats ≥3.5%, sucrose ≤55%, lecithin ≤0.5%, no additives other than lecithin and vanilla flavoring, no fats other than cocoa butter and milk fats, water ≤3%
 
Cocoa content ≥35%, cocoa butter ≥18%, water ≤3%. It is also permitted to substitute milk solids for cocoa content as follows: cocoa content ≥21%, cocoa butter ≥18%, combined milk solids & cocoa content ≥35%, milk fats ≥3%, water ≤3%.
 
Cocoa content ≥21%, cocoa butter ≥18%, milk solids ≥14%, milk fats ≥3%, water ≤3%
  
Cocoa content ≥15%, cocoa butter ≥3%, fats ≥18%, water ≤3%
 
Cocoa content ≥7%, cocoa butter ≥3%, fats ≥18%, milk solids ≥12.5%, milk fats ≥2%, water ≤3%

:

Products using milk chocolate or quasi milk chocolate as described above are handled in the same way as chocolate / quasi chocolate.
 
Processed chocolate products made from chocolate material itself or containing at least 60% chocolate material. Processed chocolate products must contain at least 40% chocolate material by weight. Amongst processed chocolate products, those containing at least 10% by weight of cream and no more than 10% of water can be called 
 
Processed chocolate products containing less than 60% chocolate material
 
The quasi symbol should officially be circled. Processed quasi chocolate products made from quasi chocolate material itself or containing at least 60% quasi chocolate material.
 
Processed quasi chocolate products containing less than 60% quasi chocolate material

United States
The U.S. Food and Drug Administration (FDA) regulates the naming and ingredients of cocoa products:

Semisweet and bittersweet are terms traditionally used in the United States to indicate the amount of added sugar in dark chocolate. Typically, bittersweet chocolate has less sugar than semisweet chocolate, but the two are interchangeable when baking. Both must contain a minimum of 35% cocoa solids.

In the American chocolate industry chocolate liquor is the ground or melted state of the nib of the cacao bean, containing roughly equal parts cocoa butter and solids.

In March 2007, the Chocolate Manufacturers Association, whose members include Hershey's, Nestlé, and Archer Daniels Midland, began lobbying the U.S. Food and Drug Administration (FDA) to change the legal definition of chocolate to allow the substitution of "safe and suitable vegetable fats and oils" (including partially hydrogenated vegetable oils) for cocoa butter in addition to using "any sweetening agent" (including artificial sweeteners) and milk substitutes. Currently, the FDA does not allow a product to be referred to as "chocolate" if the product contains any of these ingredients. To work around this restriction, products with cocoa substitutes are often branded or labeled as "chocolatey" or "made with chocolate".

See also

 Chocolate bar
 Bean-to-bar
 List of desserts
 Candy making
 Dutch process cocoa
 Gianduja, a solid chocolate containing ground hazelnuts
 Belgian chocolate
 Swiss chocolate

Notes

References

 
Types of chocolate